Tessa Thompson is an American actress of film and television. 

Thompson gained favorable notices for her early film performances in the comedy-drama Dear White People, Selma (both in 2014). She gained mainstream attention for her roles in franchise films playing Bianca Taylor in the sport dramas Creed (2015) and Creed II (2018), and for her starring role as Valkyrie in the Marvel Cinematic Universe superhero films Thor: Ragnarok (2017), Avengers: Endgame (2019), and Thor: Love and Thunder (2022), as well as her leading role in the science fiction franchise film Men in Black: International (2019). She also has received critical praise for her roles in independent films such as Sorry to Bother You (2018), Little Woods (2018), Annihilation (2018), the romantic drama Sylvie's Love (2020), and the period film Passing (2021), the latter of which earned her a British Academy Film Award nomination.

On television, she earned a Saturn Award nomination for her performance in the science fiction series Westworld (2016–present). She received a Primetime Emmy Award nomination for her work as a producer on Sylvie's Love.

Major associations

Primetime Emmy Awards

British Academy Film Awards

Critics associations

African-American Film Critics Association

Critics Choice Awards

Gotham Awards

Hamptons International Film Festival

New York Film Critics Online Awards

Online Association of Female Film Critics

San Diego Film Critics Society

Washington D.C. Film Critics Awards

Miscellaneous awards

American Black Film Festival

Black Reel Awards

Empire Awards

NAACP Image Awards

People's Choice Awards

Saturn Awards

Teen Choice Awards

References 

Thompson, Tessa, list of awards and nominations received by